Ward and Hughes (formerly Ward and Nixon) was the name of an English company producing stained-glass windows.

History
Ward and Hughes was proceeded by the company Ward and Nixon, whose studio was at 67 Frith Street, Soho. They created large window for St Stephen Coleman Street, London. James Henry Nixon worked on the restoration of the famous medieval stained glass at St. Neots in Cornwall as early as 1829. The firm became a favourite of Charles Winston, which helped them gain prestigious commissions like the east window of Lincoln Cathedral.  In 1857 Nixon died and his pupil, Henry Hughes, became the partner of Thomas Ward, and the business was renamed Ward and Hughes. Henry Hughes died on the 17th February 1883 and was buried in a family vault (no.14843) on the western side of Highgate Cemetery.

T. F. Curtis took over the firm and continued production as T. F. Curtis, Ward and Hughes until the late 1920s.

Works by Ward and Hughes
 St. Michael's Church, Sowton, Devon
 Church of the Good Shepherd, Brighton, East Sussex
 St. Mary's Church, Kingsclere, Hampshire
 St. Andrew's Church, Buxton, Norfolk
 St. Peter's Church, Dunton, Norfolk
 All Saints' Church, East Winch, Norfolk
 St. Peter's Church, Ellingham, Norfolk
 St. Margaret's Church, Felthorpe, Norfolk
 All Saints' Church, Filby, Norfolk
 St. Mary the Virgin Church, Staverton, Northamptonshire
 St. John the Evangelist's Church, Essington, South Staffordshire
 St. Mary's Church, Billingshurst, West Sussex
 St. James' Church, Draycot Cerne, Wiltshire

See also
 Stained glass - British glass, 1811-1918
 Victorian Era
 Gothic Revival

References

External links

British stained glass artists and manufacturers
Glassmaking companies of England
Defunct glassmaking companies
Defunct companies of England
British companies established in 1836
1836 establishments in England